Sir Harry Brookes Allen (13 June 1854 – 28 March 1926) was a noted Australian pathologist.

Education
Harry Brookes Allen was born at Geelong, Victoria, the son of Thomas Watts Allen. He was educated at Flinders School, Geelong, and in 1869–70 at Melbourne Church of England Grammar School. At the matriculation examination in 1870 he won the exhibitions in classics, mathematics,  English and French. At the University of Melbourne he topped the class in every year of his course, and graduated M.B. in 1876, M.D. in 1878, and B.S. in 1879.

Career
In 1876, Allen was appointed demonstrator in anatomy, in 1882 he became lecturer in anatomy and pathology, and from the beginning of 1883 was professor in these subjects. He was also pathologist at the Melbourne Hospital. He was editor of the Medical Journal of Australia 1879–83, pressure of work obliged him to give up this office. 

As a result of strong representations the government of Victoria had provided the funds for a building for the medical school, and Allen was asked to collaborate with the government architects in preparing the plans. He also succeeded in having the collection of pathological specimens at the Melbourne Hospital transferred to the university, and thus began the pathological museum to which he was henceforth to give much time. It eventually became a great collection that was invaluable in connexion with the teaching of the subject. The Harry Brookes Allen Museum of Anatomy and Pathology continues to be a valuable resource for students studying medicine and related anatomical disciplines. 

In 1883, Allen was appointed to the Central Board of Health, for which he drew up a set of by-laws for the use of local health authorities, and he did valuable work in connexion with an inquiry into tuberculosis in cattle, and also in connexion with freezing chambers for the frozen meat trade, then in its infancy. 

In 1886, Allen became dean of the faculty of medicine and succeeded in bringing in an amended curriculum for the medical course. In 1888 he was made president of the royal commission appointed to inquire into the sanitary state of Melbourne; typhoid fever was then common and the commission's report included the recommendation that a water-borne sewerage system should be adopted. This however was not commenced for some years. 

Allen was appointed president of the intercolonial rabbit commission in 1889 at the age of 35, but his reputation was already spreading beyond Victoria. In the same year he was general secretary of the intercolonial medical congress, held at Melbourne. His next important work was the obtaining of recognition of Melbourne medical degrees in Great Britain. The university petitioned the Privy Council of the United Kingdom and Allen was sent to England in 1890 to support the petition. He succeeded in satisfying the general medical council that the Melbourne curriculum was among the best in existence and the recognition was granted. In 1891 he married Ada Mason, daughter of Henry Mason.

Allen was elected to the university council in 1898, the first professor to be a member. He was a most valuable member, constant in attendance and interested in the welfare of every department. Dr Charles James Martin who was subsequently to have a distinguished career in Europe had been appointed lecturer in physiology in 1894 and Allen encouraged him in every way, eventually recommending that he should be given the title of acting professor. Martin resigned in 1903 to become director of the Lister Institute of Preventive Medicine, London. Dr William Alexander Osborne was appointed to take his place in 1904 as professor of physiology and in 1906 Dr Richard James Arthur Berry was appointed to the chair of anatomy, Allen taking the title of professor of pathology. A well-equipped laboratory of bacteriology had been established, and Allen could now feel that he had a medical school in which he could take some pride. Although apparently wrapped up in his department, he was able to spare time to do valuable work outside it. 

There were two medical societies in Melbourne at the time, the Medical Society of Victoria (of which Allen was honorary secretary 1879–87), and the Victorian branch of the British Medical Association; in 1906 Allen succeeded in healing the breach between them. In the same year there was a strong difference of opinion as to whether the proposed Institute of Tropical Medicine should be established at Sydney or Townsville, Queensland. A committee was formed with Allen as chairman. Anderson Stuart, a man of much personality, was in favour of Sydney, but Allen succeeded in persuading him to withdraw his opposition. 

In 1908, Allen was elected president of the Australasian medical congress held in Melbourne, an honour he highly valued. In 1912, he visited Europe and represented his university at the congress of universities of the empire and at the bicentenary of the medical school of Trinity College, Dublin. He was everywhere recognized as a pathologist of the highest standing. Allen was given the honorary degree of LL.D. by the University of Edinburgh in 1912, and was knighted in the New Year honours of 1914. This was also the jubilee year of the medical school at Melbourne and the opportunity was taken of presenting an excellent portrait of Allen by E. Phillips Fox to the university, the cost of which was subscribed by its medical graduates. The portrait was destroyed by fire in 1952, but a replica was hung in the pathology department.

A report of the various proceedings was published in 1914, University of Melbourne Medical School Jubilee. To this Allen contributed the opening chapter "A History of the Medical School". 

With the coming of World War I, Allen quickly realized that his students would do more valuable work by remaining and completing their courses than by enlisting as combatants. He himself worked at great pressure and possibly laid the seeds of his later break-down. In 1919 he published Pathology. Notes of Lectures and Demonstrations, a volume of nearly 500 pages.

Late life and legacy
Allen drafted a new medical curriculum in 1921, which was adopted, but he fell ill in 1923, and though he recovered temporarily, a serious cerebral haemorrhage so incapacitated him that he was obliged to give up his chair. He died at Melbourne on 28 March 1926, survived by his wife, Ada, and three daughters.  One of his daughters, Mary Cecil Allen, became well known in the United States as a painter and lecturer on art. An elder brother, George Thomas Allen, C.M.G., held a distinguished position in the Commonwealth public service.

Allen lived primarily for his work but was also interested in literature and in art. He was not without vanity, lacked humour, and made comparatively few close friends; but there was an immense earnestness in his character, and a constant striving for the best, which commanded respect. He had untiring energy, great powers of organization, and a remarkable memory. His post-mortem demonstrations were models of their kind; he was ambidextrous and showed absolute control of the materials, complete knowledge, and had a burning desire that the students should understand everything that could be learned from the particular subject. His lectures were concise and orderly, consistently keeping a very high level of instruction, and his department was run with tact and efficiency. When he first became a lecturer he shouldered everything that came his way and gradually became the guiding force in the department. George Britton Halford had laid the foundations, and considering his manifold duties had done remarkable work, but it fell to Allen to develop a really great medical school at Melbourne. Another of his monuments is The Walter and Eliza Hall Institute of Medical Research which, as the memorial plate to Allen at the Royal Melbourne Hospital states, owes its origin to his inspiration.

References

See also
 

1854 births
1926 deaths
Australian pathologists
Melbourne Medical School alumni
People educated at Melbourne Grammar School
People from Geelong
Australian Knights Bachelor